is a Japanese racewalker. He competed at the 1964 Summer Olympics and the 1968 Summer Olympics.

References

External links
 

1942 births
Living people
Place of birth missing (living people)
Japanese male racewalkers
Olympic male racewalkers
Olympic athletes of Japan
Athletes (track and field) at the 1964 Summer Olympics
Athletes (track and field) at the 1968 Summer Olympics
Japan Championships in Athletics winners
20th-century Japanese people
21st-century Japanese people